Tromba is a genus of skippers in the family Hesperiidae.

Species
Recognised species in the genus Tromba include:
 Tromba tromba Evans, 1955

References

Natural History Museum Lepidoptera genus database

Hesperiinae
Hesperiidae genera